Reuss-Lobenstein was a state located in the German part of the Holy Roman Empire.

History
The members of Reuss-Lobenstein family belonged to the Reuss Junior Line. Reuss-Lobenstein has existed on two occasions, it was firstly created in 1425 as a lordship with Heinrich II, Lord of Reuss-Lobenstein becoming the first ruler. The first Lordship of Reuss-Lobenstein came to an end in 1547 when the territory went to Reuss-Plauen.

Reuss-Lobenstein was recreated in 1647 again as a lordship which it remained until 1673 when the title of lord was upgraded to count. Following the death of Count Henry X in 1671, Reuss-Lobenstein was ruled jointly by his three sons Heinrich III, Heinrich VIII and Heinrich X. In 1678 Reuss-Lobenstein was partitioned with Heinrich III remaining Count of Reuss-Lobenstein, Heinrich VIII becoming Count of Reuss-Hirschberg and Heinrich X becoming the Count of Reuss-Ebersdorf. Reuss-Lobenstein was partitioned for a second time in 1710 following the death of Heinrich III with Reuss-Selbitz being created for a younger son Heinrich XXVI while his eldest son Heinrich XV succeeded him as count of Reuss-Lobenstein.

Reuss-Lobenstein was raised to a principality in 1790 and joined the Confederation of the Rhine on 15 December 1806. With the death of Prince Heinrich LIV in 1824 the Reuss-Lobenstein line became extinct and was inherited by the Prince of Reuss-Ebersdorf.

Rulers of Reuss-Lobenstein

Lords of Reuss-Lobenstein, 1425–1547 
 Heinrich II, 1425–70
 Heinrich I, 1482–87
 Heinrich II, 1482–1500, with
 Heinrich III, 1482–1498
 Heinrich I, 1500–38, with
 Heinrich II, 1500–1547
To Reuss-Plauen, 1547

Lords of Reuss-Lobenstein 1647–1673 
 Heinrich X, 1647–71
 Heinrich III, 1671–1710, with
 Heinrich VIII, 1671–73 and
 Heinrich X, 1671–73
Raised to county, 1673

Counts of Reuss-Lobenstein (1673–1790) 
 Heinrich III, 1673–1710, with
 Heinrich VIII (count of Reuss-Hirschberg from 1678), 1673–78 and
 Heinrich X (count of Reuss-Ebersdorf from 1678), 1673–78
 Heinrich XV, 1710–39
 Heinrich II, 1739–82
 Heinrich XXXV, 1782–90
Raised to principality, 1790

Princes of Reuss-Lobenstein (1790–1824) 
Heinrich XXXV, 1790–1805
Heinrich LIV, 1805–24
To Reuss-Ebersdorf, 1824

Former states and territories of Thuringia
States of the Confederation of the Rhine
1547 disestablishments in the Holy Roman Empire
Upper Saxon Circle
Lobenstein
States and territories established in 1647
States and territories established in 1425
1420s establishments in the Holy Roman Empire
1425 establishments in Europe
1647 establishments in the Holy Roman Empire
1824 disestablishments in Germany